Joseph L. Epps (May 16, 1870 – June 20, 1952) was a United States Army private who received the Medal of Honor for his actions on December 4, 1899, during the Philippine–American War.

Epps is buried at Greenhill Cemetery in Muskogee, Oklahoma.

Medal of Honor citation
Rank and Organization: Private, Company B, 33d Infantry, U.S. Volunteers. Place and Date: At Vigan, Luzon, Philippine Islands, December 4, 1899. Entered Service At: Oklahoma Indian Territory. Birth: Jamestown, Mo. Date of Issue: February 7, 1902.

Citation:

Discovered a party of insurgents inside a wall, climbed to the top of the wall, covered them with his gun, and forced them to stack arms and surrender.

See also

List of Medal of Honor recipients
List of Philippine–American War Medal of Honor recipients

Notes

References

1870 births
1950 deaths
People from Moniteau County, Missouri
United States Army soldiers
American military personnel of the Philippine–American War
People from Muskogee, Oklahoma
United States Army Medal of Honor recipients
Philippine–American War recipients of the Medal of Honor